Sarah Elizabeth Huckabee Sanders (born August 13, 1982) is an American politician serving as the 47th governor of Arkansas since 2023. She is the daughter of Mike Huckabee, who served as the 44th governor of Arkansas from 1996 to 2007. A member of the Republican Party, she was the 31st White House press secretary, serving under President Donald Trump from 2017 to 2019. Sanders was the third woman to hold the job of White House Press Secretary. She also served as a senior advisor on Trump's 2016 presidential campaign. Sanders became the Republican nominee in the 2022 Arkansas gubernatorial election and won, defeating Democratic nominee Chris Jones.

As press secretary, Sanders was the spokesperson for the Trump administration's policy decisions, and had a confrontational relationship with the White House Press Corps. When interviewed by investigators as part of the Mueller probe, she admitted making false statements in her role. Sanders hosted fewer press conferences than any of the 13 previous White House press secretaries.

In June 2019, Trump tweeted that Sanders would be leaving her role as press secretary. On January 25, 2021, she announced her candidacy for governor of Arkansas; Trump endorsed her. She secured the Republican nomination in May 2022; her general election opponents were the Democratic nominee, Chris Jones, and the Libertarian nominee, Ricky Dale Harrington. She is the first woman to hold the office, the first woman to be governor of a state of which her father was also governor, and the youngest current governor.

Sanders has been recognized in Fortune and TIME magazine's "40 under 40". She is the author of The New York Times bestseller Speaking for Myself, is a former Fox News Channel contributor, and served on the Fulbright board.

Early life and education
Sarah Elizabeth Huckabee was born on August 13, 1982, in Hope, Arkansas. She is the youngest child and only daughter of Mike Huckabee and Janet Huckabee (née McCain), both politicians. She has two brothers, John Mark Huckabee and David Huckabee. After graduating from Little Rock Central High School in Little Rock, Arkansas, Huckabee attended Ouachita Baptist University (her father's alma mater) in Arkadelphia, Arkansas. She was elected student body president of the university and was active in Republican organizations. In 2004, she graduated from the university with a Bachelor of Arts degree, majoring in political science and minoring in mass communications.

Career

Early political career

Sanders was involved in her father's first campaign for the United States Senate in 1992. Describing the unsuccessful bid in an interview for The Hill, she said: "He didn't really have much of a staff, so our family has been very engaged and very supportive of my dad. I was stuffing envelopes, I was knocking on doors, I was putting up yard signs." Her father said of her childhood, "I always say that when most kids are seven or eight years old out jumping rope, she was sitting at the kitchen table listening to political commentators analyze poll results." Huckabee said that he and his wife spoiled Sarah at times. He called her "doggone tough" and "fearless" due to having grown up with two brothers.

Sanders was a field coordinator for her father's 2002 reelection campaign for governor of Arkansas. She was a regional liaison for congressional affairs at the U.S. Department of Education under President George W. Bush, and worked as a field coordinator for Bush's reelection campaign in Ohio in 2004.

Sanders is a founding partner of Second Street Strategies in Little Rock, a general consulting services provider for Republican campaigns. She worked on national political campaigns and campaigns for federal office in Arkansas. Sanders was also vice president of Tsamoutales Strategies. She was national political director for her father's 2008 presidential campaign. She was also a senior adviser to Tim Pawlenty in his 2012 presidential run. Sanders was involved in the campaigns of both U.S. senators from Arkansas, managing John Boozman's 2010 campaign and serving as a senior adviser to Tom Cotton's 2014 campaign. After her father's 2008 campaign, she worked as executive director of Huck PAC, a political action committee. Sanders was also the national campaign manager for the ONE Campaign, a global nonprofit founded by Bono aimed at ending global poverty and preventable diseases. In 2016, after managing her father's presidential campaign, she signed on as a senior adviser for Donald Trump's 2016 presidential campaign and ran its communications for coalitions.

Trump administration

After Trump was elected, Sanders was named to the position of deputy White House press secretary in his new administration. On May 5, 2017, she held her first White House press briefing, standing in for Press Secretary Sean Spicer, who was serving on Naval Reserve duty. She continued to cover for Spicer until his return to the podium on May 12. She stood in for Spicer during the dismissal of James Comey and the controversy following it. Her defense of the Trump administration's actions led to some speculation that Trump was considering promoting her to replace Spicer. This was denied at the time by her father. But on May 26, The Wall Street Journal again suggested that Sanders was being considered as a possible replacement for Spicer, in the context of wider staff changes and the investigation into alleged communications with Russia. She continued to fill in for Spicer occasionally.

After Trump dismissed FBI director James Comey in May 2017, Sanders said that she "heard from countless members of the FBI that are grateful and thankful for the President's decision" to fire him. Emails show that several FBI heads of regional field offices and high-ranking FBI members reacted with dismay to Comey's firing. After Trump sought to discredit Comey and the FBI, Sanders was questioned on a tweet she had sent during the 2016 presidential election that "when you're attacking FBI agents because you're under criminal investigation, you're losing". After Comey accused Trump of lying about the circumstances in which he was dismissed, Sanders defended Trump: "I can definitively say the president is not a liar, and I think it's frankly insulting that question would be asked."

On June 27, 2017, during a press briefing, Sanders criticized the media, accusing them of spreading "fake news" about Trump. Sanders cited a video created by James O'Keefe. Although unsure of the video's accuracy, she said, "I would encourage everyone in this room and, frankly, everybody across the country to take a look at it." The video features CNN's health and medical producer, John Bonifield, saying that CNN's coverage of the Trump campaign's alleged links to Russia are "mostly bullshit" and driven by ratings. Special counsel Robert Mueller found that Russia did interfere with the election, but “did not find that the Trump campaign, or anyone associated with it, conspired or coordinated with the Russian government in these efforts"  

On June 29, 2017, Sanders said during a press briefing that the "president in no way, form or fashion has ever promoted or encouraged violence." In February 2016, Trump had said during a campaign speech: "So if you see somebody getting ready to throw a tomato, knock the crap out of them, would you?... I promise you, I will pay for the legal fees. I promise." Politifact also "found at least seven other examples in which Trump offered public musings that showed a tolerance for, and sometimes even a favorable disposition towards physical violence."

On July 21, 2017, after Spicer announced that he was going to resign, newly appointed White House Communications Director Anthony Scaramucci announced that Sanders would take the role of White House press secretary. Sanders is the third woman to hold the role of White House Press Secretary after Dee Dee Myers in 1993 and Dana Perino in 2007. Sanders is the first mother, and first working mother, to ever hold the position.

In August 2017, Sanders said Trump "certainly didn't dictate" a statement released by Donald Trump Jr. about the 2016 Trump Tower meeting with Russians. She also said that Trump "weighed in, offered suggestion like any father would do." In January 2018, Trump's lawyers wrote to the special counsel investigation that "the President dictated" the statement Donald Trump Jr. released. In June 2018, the media asked Sanders to explain the discrepancy in the statements, but she repeatedly refused to answer, saying: "I'm not going to respond to a letter from the president's outside counsel ... We've purposefully walled off, and I would refer you to them for comment", and "I'm an honest person".

In October 2017, CBS News's Jacqueline Alemany asked Sanders whether the official White House position was that all 16 women who accused Trump of sexual harassment were lying. Sanders responded, "Yeah, we've been clear on that since the beginning, and the President has spoken on it", without elaborating.

In November 2017, Trump retweeted three unverified anti-Muslim videos by Britain First, a far-right British group with a history of posting misleading videos. Sanders commented, "Whether it's a real video, the threat is real and that is what the president is talking about, that's what the president is focused on, is dealing with those real threats, and those are real no matter how you're looking at it." Theresa May, the Prime Minister of the United Kingdom, was among those to criticize Trump's actions.

In February 2018, after Rob Porter left the White House over domestic abuse allegations, Sanders said that Porter's background check was "ongoing, and the White House had not received any specific papers regarding the completion of that background check". After FBI director Christopher Wray testified that the FBI had finished and submitted its security-clearance investigation on Porter to the White House earlier in July 2017, Sanders instead claimed that it was instead the White House's personnel security office's investigation that was ongoing, which contradicted her earlier statement that the clearance process "doesn't operate within the White House". She said that Porter had made a "personal decision" to leave the White House, while White House deputy press secretary Raj Shah said that Porter was "terminated".

In March 2018, Sanders said of the Stormy Daniels–Donald Trump scandal, "there was no knowledge of any payments from the president" to Daniels. In May 2018, Trump's lawyer Rudy Giuliani said that Trump had repaid his lawyer Michael Cohen $130,000 after Cohen paid Daniels. In response to questions about the discrepancy, Sanders claimed that she did not know of this development and that her earlier statement was based on the "best information" she had at the time.

In mid-June 2018, when questioned on the Trump administration's family separation policy, which resulted in the separation of migrant children from their parents at the Mexico–United States border, Sanders falsely blamed Democrats for the policy and said "it is very biblical" to implement the policy. Christian leaders such as Daniel DiNardo and Franklin Graham strongly disagreed with the policy, calling it "immoral" or "disgraceful", while Bible scholar and professor Matthew Schlimm said that the Bible was being misused just as slave traders and Nazis had done.

In July 2018, Sanders said the Trump White House would discuss allowing Russian agents to interrogate former U.S. Ambassador to Russia Michael McFaul. The Russian government had harassed and intimidated McFaul for years, without specifying what criminal allegations they would interrogate him about. U.S. State Department spokeswoman Heather Nauert said that she could not answer on the White House's behalf, but that the State Department considered the Russian allegations against McFaul "absolutely absurd". Several current and former diplomats condemned the White House's willingness to entertain Russian interrogation of a former U.S. ambassador.

In an August 2018 press conference, Sanders was repeatedly asked by Jim Acosta, a CNN reporter, to say that the press was not the "enemy of the people", and she did not do so. Sanders had a tumultuous relationship with the press and was the subject of numerous personal attacks regarding her looks and her weight. That same month, Jeff Bezos' newspaper, The Washington Post, wrote that Sanders and her deputy Bill Shine strategized optimal times to release announcements that the security clearances of various Trump critics and officials involved in the probe into Russian interference in the 2016 election had been revoked. The announcements were intended to be released to distract from news cycles that were unfavorable to the White House.

The morning after publication of the September 5, 2018, New York Times op-ed "I Am Part of the Resistance Inside the Trump Administration", Sanders used her official government Twitter account to tweet that the anonymous writer was a "gutless loser" and to charge that those in the newspaper's opinion department are "the only ones complicit in this deceitful act". Her September 6 tweet gave the telephone number of the newspaper's opinion desk, and two former White House ethics chiefs declared that her tweet had violated federal law in an abuse of power, similar to her June 23, 2018, tweet specifically naming the restaurant that had refused her service in the Red Hen restaurant controversy.

In early November, CNN's Jim Acosta engaged in a verbal argument with Trump. While Acosta was asking Trump a question, an intern, at Trump's direction, tried to take away Acosta's microphone. Later in the day, Acosta's White House credentials were suspended, a move that was widely criticized as unprecedented. The next day, to justify the White House's actions, Sanders released a video of the moment the intern tried to grab the microphone from Acosta's hand. The video originated from conspiracy theorist Paul Joseph Watson of the far-right website Infowars, and was allegedly altered to make Acosta seem aggressive and excluded him saying, "Pardon me, ma'am", to the intern. Watson denied that the video was doctored in any way.

CNN Communications Executive called Sanders's sharing of the video "shameful" and the White House News Photographers Association said it was "appalled" by her actions, called video manipulation "deceptive, dangerous and unethical", and said that what Sanders did was "equally problematic".
 	
During the 2018–2019 federal government shutdown caused by Congress's refusal to fulfill Trump's demand for $5.7 billion in federal funds for a U.S.–Mexico border wall, Sanders argued that the wall was necessary, claiming that the CBP stopped nearly 4,000 known or suspected terrorists when they crossed the Mexico border in 2018. Data obtained by NBC News contradicted Sanders's assertion, showing that from October 1, 2017, to March 31, 2018, only six immigrants on the No Fly List (also known as the terror watch list) were encountered at the ports of entry on the Mexico border. In an interview with Chris Wallace on Fox News, Wallace countered her claim of nearly 4,000 terrorists, saying, "I know the statistic. I didn't know if you were going to use it, but I studied up on this. Do you know where those 4,000 people come—where they are captured? Airports."

In January 2019 Sanders said on the Christian Broadcasting Network that she thinks "God calls all of us to fill different roles at different times, and I think that he wanted Donald Trump to become president".

On June 13, 2019, Trump tweeted that Sanders would be leave her role as press secretary on June 30. Under Sanders, the White House set at least three records for the most days between formal press briefings. The White House had a 41-day streak that ended in January 2019, then a 42-day streak that ended in March 2019, followed by 94 days and counting without a formal press briefing when Sanders's departure was announced.

Mueller report findings 
On April 18, 2019, the first volume of the Mueller report, the Special Counsel Investigation report compiled by Robert Mueller, revealed that Sanders admitted that she had lied during a press conference when she said various things about James Comey, the former FBI director. This included lying about the firing of former Attorney General Jeff Sessions and Deputy Attorney General Rod Rosenstein's connection to Comey's firing, and her claim that "countless" FBI agents had lost faith in him. She repeatedly told the press that "countless members" of the FBI had contacted her to complain about Comey, but admitted to investigators that her claims were "a slip of the tongue" and "not founded on anything". When a redacted version of the special counsel's report was publicly revealed, Sanders defended herself, saying that her comments about the FBI agents were made in "the heat of the moment" and unscripted.

Sanders also lied about Trump's being in charge of a statement regarding the Trump Tower meeting. He worked on said statement with his advisor Hope Hicks, and when the emails about that statement were made public, it was reported that he had helped with it himself. According to the report, Sanders also made false statements about when Trump decided to fire Comey, as well as lying about Sessions's and Rosenstein's involvement in Comey's firing. The New York Times said that the revelation of false statements showed a "culture of dishonesty" at the White House. Of Sanders defending her comments on FBI agents, The New York Times wrote: "It has been a hallmark of the Trump White House never to admit a mistake, never to apologize and never to cede a point. This case was no different."

Sanders's rhetoric about the report was found to be misleading or false. In March 2019, after Attorney General William Barr released a summary of Mueller's report on Russian interference in the 2016 election, Sanders falsely claimed that the investigation's findings were "a total and complete exoneration". The summary of the report stated it "does not exonerate him". Sanders repeated her suggestion that the report exonerated Trump in May 2019, and falsely claimed that Mueller had "closed the case". The Associated Press noted, "Mueller did not fully exonerate Trump or declare that a possible case against Trump to be 'closed.' Mueller announced his work was finished specifically leaving it open for Congress to decide on possible charges of wrongdoing."

Career after the White House 
On August 22, 2019, Fox News announced that Sanders would become a contributor to the network, effective September 6. During the December 2019 Democratic presidential debate, Sanders mocked Joe Biden's stutter on Twitter. She apologized the next day.

Following the January 6 United States Capitol attack, the editor of Forbes warned corporations against hiring Sanders and other Trump "propagandists", writing, "Forbes will assume that everything your company or firm talks about is a lie."

Governor of Arkansas

2022 gubernatorial election 

On January 25, 2021, Sanders announced her candidacy for governor of Arkansas, an office her father, Mike Huckabee, held from 1996 to 2007. A day later, Trump endorsed Sanders, calling her "a warrior". On July 16, 2021, Sanders broke the Arkansas gubernatorial fundraising record by raising over $9 million. Running during the COVID-19 pandemic, she pledged not to implement any mask mandates or vaccine mandates. She also supported restrictions on abortion, saying that she would not support exceptions for rape and incest in anti-abortion legislation.

In October 2021, the Arkansas Law Notes published an article that called into question whether Sanders was even eligible to run for governor. The article centers on whether Sanders meets the State Constitution's residency requirement of seven years.

Sanders handily won the Republican primary and defeated Democratic nominee Chris Jones in the general election.

On November 9, 2022, it was announced that Sanders had won the race and would become Arkansas's first female governor, and the first woman to be governor of a state her father was governor of.

Tenure 
Sanders was sworn in on January 10, 2023. On her first day in office, Sanders banned the term Latinx from being officially used in the state government.  The decision came after hearing feedback from Hispanic leaders in the state, state lawmakers and senior members of staff.

In 2023, Huckabee Sanders signed a bill to allow a privately funded anti-abortion "monument to the unborn" to be displayed on Capitol grounds. The monument will mark the number of abortions performed in the state before the U.S. Supreme Court overturned Roe v. Wade.

Appointments 
Sanders has announced her intention to appoint Assistant U.S. Attorney Allison Waldrip Bragg to be the state Inspector General.

She will retain Daryl Basset, the incumbent from Arkansas's previous administration, as Secretary of Labor and Licensing.

Sanders appointed attorney Caleb Osborne to serve as Division of Environmental Quality (DEQ) Director and Chief Administrator of Environment. Osborne previously served DEQ as the Associate Director for the Office of Water Quality and as the Chief of Staff for the Department of Parks, Heritage, and Tourism.

Clint O'Neal will serve as Executive Director of the Arkansas Economic Development Commission (AEDC); O'Neal has served as the Deputy Director of Global Business at AEDC since 2018.

In popular culture
In 2010, Sanders was named one of Times "40 under 40" in politics. At the 2018 White House Correspondents Dinner, comedienne Michelle Wolf made several jokes at Sanders's expense. Maggie Haberman of The New York Times tweeted, "That @PressSec sat and absorbed intense criticism of her physical appearance, her job performance, and so forth, instead of walking out, on national television, was impressive." MSNBC co-host Mika Brzezinski responded, "Watching a wife and mother be humiliated on national television for her looks is deplorable." 

Like several of her White House colleagues, Sanders was also satirized on Saturday Night Live, where she was portrayed by Aidy Bryant, who made fun of her weight. The skit was criticized for "fat-shaming" and called misogynistic, and led Hollywood personalities to call on writers and showrunners to end weight-based jokes.

Personal life
Huckabee met Bryan Sanders during her father's 2008 presidential campaign. She was the campaign's field director, and Sanders was hired as a media consultant. The couple married in 2010. They have three children and a golden retriever. Bryan Sanders is a political strategist recognized as a "Rising Star in American Politics" by Campaigns and Elections magazine.  He is a graduate of Colby College with a degree in government.

On June 22, 2018, a co-owner of a 26-seat restaurant in Lexington, Virginia,  from Washington, D.C., asked Sanders to leave the restaurant because she worked for the Trump administration, giving rise to the Red Hen restaurant controversy. 

Sanders was diagnosed with papillary thyroid cancer in September 2022. She had surgery to remove her thyroid and the surrounding lymph nodes.

Electoral history

References

External links

|-

 
|-

|-

|-

|-

|-

 

 

1982 births
21st-century American politicians
21st-century American women politicians
American political consultants
George W. Bush administration personnel
Republican Party governors of Arkansas
Little Rock Central High School alumni
Living people
Mike Huckabee
Ouachita Baptist University alumni
Politicians from Little Rock, Arkansas
Trump administration personnel
White House Press Secretaries
Women in Arkansas politics
Women state governors of the United States